Chulu Chululu sometimes referred to as Chululu is a Fijian song that has been covered by a multitude of artists ranging from Peter Posa to Bill Sevesi & His Islanders. An English version of this song was a hit for Bill and Boyd.

Background
The song of Fijian origin is considered to be very well known in Fiji and the Pacific. It is also a popular party song. The Fijian version begins with the lyrics "" with this verse repeated five times throughout the song. The song was originally composed by Sam Freedman whose songs have been covered by The Kingston Trio, Bill Sevesi and Maria Dallas etc.

Eddie Lund version
It was possibly first commercially released by Eddie Lund & His Tahitians and released on record in 1958. It was released as a single on Viking Records in May 1958. The B side "Samoa Silasila" was sung in Samoan. According to the National Public Library of New Zealand, the group that recorded it was an Auckland based Tahitian group. It appeared on Lund's Lure of Tahiti album which was released in 1960.

English version
The song was recorded by Bill & Boyd in Rotorua, New Zealand 1964. It became a hit for them and appeared on their album Songs for a cloudy afternoon. The English version was written by Bill Cate and Bill Robertson. Bill and Boyd rerecorded the song in 1974 and that version appeared as the B-side to the single, "Santa Never Made It Into Darwin". The single was recorded to raise money after the devastating 1974 cyclone that decimated Darwin.

Other versions
In 1993, New Zealand group The Radars recorded their version of the song as the B side to "The Banana Boat Song" released on the Epic label. It gained them an award under the Best Polynesian Album award, beating finalists Dalvanius & the Patea Maori Club and the Kaiwhaiki Cultural Club. The Wiggles also recorded their version on their Wake Up Jeff! album.

Releases

References

Fijian songs
Year of song unknown
Songwriter unknown